Togston is a settlement and civil parish about 10 miles from Morpeth, in the county of Northumberland, England. The parish includes the hamlet of North Togston. In 2011 the parish had a population of 315. The parish borders Acklington, Amble By the Sea, East Chevington and Hauxley.

Features 
There are 7 listed buildings in Togston.

History 
The name "Togston" means 'Tocg's valley'. Togston was formerly a township in the parish of Warkworth, in 1866 Togston became a civil parish in its own right.

References

External links 
 Parish council
 

Villages in Northumberland
Civil parishes in Northumberland